Namao is a hamlet in central Alberta, Canada within Sturgeon County. It was the namesake of RCAF Station Namao, now CFB Edmonton, which is directly south of the hamlet.

History 
On August 22, 1891, the Edmonton Bulletin reported that, "The Sturgeon river settlers had been requesting a post office since May 3, 1884. They had wanted to call it Wilson Valley at first, then Sturgeon and finally Naoma (Namao)." It opened on April 12, 1892. According to Wilfred McLean, Dan [McKinley, who took up one of the first Sturgeon homesteads in the early 1880s] insisted on the name; "[He] had associated with the Indians for quite a few years and knew quite a few Cree words.", The name is derived from the Cree word , meaning "sturgeon".

On May 19, 1892, Postmaster J. Johnstone wrote that Nemao' is the correct spelling of the name of the post office in the Sturgeon river settlement."

Demographics 
The population of Namao according to the 2010 municipal census conducted by Sturgeon County is 10.

Climate

See also 
List of communities in Alberta
List of hamlets in Alberta

References 

Hamlets in Alberta
Sturgeon County